Maines is a surname. Notable people with the surname include:

Dan Maines (born 1971), American musician, best known as the bassist for Clutch
John Maines (born 1948), British musician
Lloyd Maines (born 1951), American musician
Natalie Maines (born 1974), American singer-songwriter

See also
Maine (surname)